Panjgur is a district in the west Balochistan province of Pakistan. Panjgur was one of three districts of Makran District until 1 July 1977, when the district became a part of Makran Division. The other two districts of Makran Division are Kech (Turbat) and Gwadar. Chitkan is the district headquarter. Panjgur has sixteen (16) Union Councils.

Panjgur (literally: Five Graves) is home to several archaeological sites, including centuries-old tombs, an old dam called Band-e-Gillar, remnants of a fort at Khudabadan (the historical fort of Nawab Kharan) and some remnants of the old port of Issai. The seasonal Rakshan River flows right in the middle of Panjgur, dividing it into two parts, the northern and southern Panjgur.

Etymology
In Iranian languages, "panj" means "five" and "gor" means "graves". There are five popular graves in this district, which give it the name Panjgur or Panjgor.

Administrative divisions
The district is administratively subdivided into three tehsils which contain a total of 16 Union Councils:

 Paroom
 Panjgur
 Gichk

Demographics
At the time of the 2017 census the district had a population of 315,353, of which 166,379 were males and 148,952 females. Rural population was 234,942 (74.50%) while the urban population was 80,411 (25.50%). The literacy rate was 59.22% - the male literacy rate was 66.69% while the female literacy rate was 51.24%. 310 people in the district were from religious minorities. Balochi was the predominant language, spoken by 97.51% of the population.

Transport
Panjgur Airport (IATA: PJG, ICAO: OPPG) is a domestic airport. Its short runway stretches only 1524 meters. PIA started flights to Sharjah in 2013 but these have been suspended by PIA. People in Panjgur normally travel by buses to bigger cities like Quetta and Karachi.

References

External links

 Pangur District at www.balochistan.gov.pk
 Panjgur District at www.balochistanpolice.gov.pk

 
Districts of Pakistan
Districts of Balochistan, Pakistan